Skoptic syndrome is a proposed form of body dysmorphic disorder characterized by a desire to remove sex characteristics. It is proposed to be associated with genital self-mutilation, such as castration, penectomy or clitoridectomy.

Description 

Skoptic Syndrome is a body dysmorphic disorder characterized by the desire to be eunuch, named after the Skoptzy sect. However it is not in DSM-5, and it is virtually unknown in psychological literature. The term is not applicable to all people with a desire for castration, due to the highly diverse nature of reasons for volunteer castration. 

Skoptic syndrome can sometimes be motivated by intense sexual guilt, in which the genitals become identified as the source of the guilt-inducing sexual desire. This leads to desire for removal of or damage to the genitals. There is also evidence that voluntary castration is used in modern societies for reasons such as control of libido, body modification and, in some cases of extreme sexual masochism, for purposes of sexual excitement (see paraphilia).

Castration has a history, up to the modern age, of therapeutic use. According to Victor T. Cheney, in his Castration: Advantages and Disadvantages, castration has been documented to reduce symptoms in people with schizophrenia, psychosis, violent behaviors, paraphilias, mania, overactive libido, baldness, sleep apnea and prostate disorders (all things that are exacerbated by testosterone), as well as reducing the incidence of various sexually transmitted diseases, by means of eliminated or reduced sexual activity. 

Some people may seek relief from physical or psychological problems, while others derive sexual excitement from the idea of being castrated or otherwise having their genitals mutilated, usually by another person (see masochism and paraphilia). This desire is still present in modern populations, as evidenced in the large membership in message boards on the Internet related to the topic.

There has been frequent news coverage of incidents of self-castration and underground networks of people without medical licenses performing castrations, because this condition is not medically recognized.

According to a June 12, 2002 article in the Detroit Free Press, "Self-castrations tend to be more common than leaving the job to someone else," said Dr. Dana Ohl, a urologist at the University of Michigan Medical Center who has operated on those who have botched amateur castrations. "Usually, when these people just chop their own testicles off, they don't pay attention to the blood supply," he said.

See also
Nullo

References

Notes
 Voluntary Genital Ablations: Contrasting the Cutters and Their Clients
This site only for its references, as it is a paywall site. The hidden world of self-castration and testicular self-injury

Further reading
Dr. John Money, "The Skoptic Syndrome: castration and genital self-mutilation as an example of sexual body-image pathology.", Journal of Psychology and Human Sexuality, Volume 1 1988.

Gender identity
Castration
Sexual disorders